Ro-13, originally named Submarine No. 23, was an Imperial Japanese Navy Kaichū-Type submarine of the Kaichū II subclass. She was commissioned in 1920 and operated in the waters of Japan. She was stricken in 1932.

Design and description
The submarines of the Kaichu II sub-class were larger and had a greater range than the preceding Kaichu I subclass, but they had the same powerplant, so their greater size resulted in a loss of some speed. They also had a modified conning tower, bow, and stern, and the stern was overhanging. They displaced  surfaced and  submerged.

For surface running, the submarines were powered by two  Sulzer Mark II diesel engines, each driving one propeller shaft. When submerged each propeller was driven by a  electric motor. They could reach  on the surface and  underwater.

The submarines were armed with six  torpedo tubes, four internal tubes in the bow and two external tubes mounted on the upper deck, and carried a total of ten Type 44 torpedoes. They were also armed with a single  deck gun mounted aft of the conning tower.

Construction and commissioning

Ro-13 was laid down as Submarine No. 23 on 14 September 1918 by the Kure Naval Arsenal at Kure, Japan. Launched on 26 August 1919, she was completed and commissioned on 30 September 1920.

Service history

Upon commissioning, Submarine No. 23 was attached to the Kure Naval District and was assigned to the Kure Defense Division. On 1 December 1920 she was reassigned to Submarine Division 14 in Submarine Squadron 1 in the 1st Fleet. Submarine Division 14 was assigned to the Kure Defense Division and Kure Naval District on 1 July 1921, then to Submarine Squadron 2 in the 2nd Fleet on 1 December 1922.

On 1 December 1923, Submarine No. 23 was transferred to Submarine Division 3, assigned to duty in the Yokosuka Defense Division, and attached to the Yokosuka Naval District, and she remained in all three of those assignments for the remainder of her active career. She was renamed Ro-13 on 1 November 1924.

Ro-13 was stricken from the Navy list on 1 April 1932. She was renamed Haisen No. 2 that day.

Notes

References
, History of Pacific War Vol.17 I-Gō Submarines, Gakken (Japan), January 1998, 
Rekishi Gunzō, History of Pacific War Extra, "Perfect guide, The submarines of the Imperial Japanese Forces", Gakken (Japan), March 2005, 
The Maru Special, Japanese Naval Vessels No.43 Japanese Submarines III, Ushio Shobō (Japan), September 1980, Book code 68343-44
The Maru Special, Japanese Naval Vessels No.132 Japanese Submarines I "Revised edition", Ushio Shobō (Japan), February 1988, Book code 68344-36
The Maru Special, Japanese Naval Vessels No.133 Japanese Submarines II "Revised edition", Ushio Shobō (Japan), March 1988, Book code 68344-37
The Maru Special, Japanese Naval Vessels No.135 Japanese Submarines IV, Ushio Shobō (Japan), May 1988, Book code 68344-39

Ro-13-class submarines
Kaichū type submarines
Ships built by Kure Naval Arsenal
1919 ships